The list of ship launches in 1971 includes a chronological list of all ships launched in 1971.


References

Sources

1971
Ship launches